is a former member of the Hello! Project group Country Musume, singer, model and talent.

Personal life
Her husband is Japanese baseball player Masahiro Tanaka, who pitched for the New York Yankees from 2014 to 2020. They have a little boy in 2016.

Biography
She was also a member of Hello! Project's futsal team, Gatas Brilhantes H.P. She has released one self-titled solo photobook and also a single,  with the comedian duo, Fujioka Fujimaki.

In early 2007, Satoda was added to the unit Pabo along with Suzanne and Yukina Kinoshita, created by the Fuji TV's quiz show Quiz! Hexagon II. The group released the single "Koi no Hexagon", used as the show's closing theme. She was later added to the group Ongaku Gatas.

Discography and releases

in Hello! Project - Up-Front Group Discography

Singles (Country Musume.)

In Country Musume. ni Rika Ishikawa (Morning Musume.)

In Country Musume. ni Konno to Fujimoto (Morning Musume.)

Singles (Romans)

In Romans

Singles (Mai Satoda with Fujimaki Fujioka)

Mai Satoda with Fujimaki Fujioka

Singles (Ongaku Gatas)

In Ongaku Gatas
 
 
 Come Together (released Sep 10, 2008)
 READY! KICK OFF!! (released Mar 6, 2010)

Albums

In Country Musume.

In Ongaku Gatas
 1st GOODSAL (released Feb 6, 2008)

Other Discography

Singles
 
 
 "Don't leave me" (with Gōda Kazoku, released June 17, 2009)

In Pabo

In Aladdin

Photobooks
 
 My Life (released March 21, 2007)
 Mai-Thai (released December 26, 2007)

References

External links
 里田まいの里田米 - Satoda's personal blog 
 里田まい - hi5 private profile 
 Official Hello! Project profile 
 Up-Front Works: Mai Satoda Official discography entry 
 Hello! Database: Mai Satoda 
  

1984 births
Living people
Japanese female models
Japanese television personalities
Japanese idols
Japanese women pop singers
Country Musume members
Elegies (group) members
7Air members
Musicians from Sapporo